Fred Emanuel Foldvary (May 11, 1946 – June 5, 2021) was a lecturer in economics at San Jose State University, California, and a research fellow at The Independent Institute. He previously taught at Santa Clara University and other colleges. He was also a commentator and senior editor for the online journal The Progress Report and an associate editor of the online journal Econ Journal Watch.  He served on the board of directors for the Robert Schalkenbach Foundation.

Work
In his PhD dissertation (George Mason University, 1992) titled "Public Goods and Private Communities", Foldvary applied the theory of public goods and Industrial organization to refute the concept of market failure, including case studies of several types of private communities.  His research interests included ethics, governance, land economics and public finance.

His support of geolibertarianism (a libertarian ideology which embraces the Georgist philosophy of property) and his advocacy of civil liberties and free markets have gained him a place of high visibility in the geolibertarian movement. In 2000, he ran for Congress in California's 9th District as a Libertarian. He received 3.3% of the total vote to finish third among the four candidates on the ballot.

Foldvary wrote on topics including ending slavery in chocolate plantations; a green tax shift to protect the environment while enhancing the economy; reforming democracy with small-group voting; and solving territorial conflict with confederations and the payment of rent for occupied land.  Three central and recurring themes of Foldvary's writing are the universal ethic, cellular democracy, and public revenue from land rent.

In 1998, he predicted there would be a real estate-related recession in 2008 and a tech bubble collapse in the year 1999 or 2000. In 2007, Foldvary published a booklet entitled The Depression of 2008. In a 2011 paper, Mason Gaffney, Professor of Economics at UC Riverside, criticized the economic community for excluding and ignoring Foldvary.

Personal life 
Foldvary lived in the San Francisco Bay Area in California.

Death
Foldvary died, aged 75, on June 5, 2021.

Books
 The Soul of Liberty (1980) The Gutenberg Press. 
 Public Goods and Private Communities (1994) Edward Elgar Publishing 
 Beyond Neoclassical Economics (1996) Edward Elgar Publishing 
 Dictionary of Free Market Economics (1998) Edward Elgar Publishing 
 The Half-Life of Policy Rationales: How Technology Affects Old Policy Issues (ed., with Daniel Klein, 2003) 
 The Depression of 2008 (2007) The Gutenberg Press.

See also

 Cellular democracy
 Free banking
 Georgism
 Grassroots democracy
 Geolibertarianism 
 Green libertarianism
 Land value tax
 Libertarian Party of California
 Neoclassical liberalism
 Subsidiarity

Notes

References
 Research Fellow, Fred E. Foldvary
 Curriculum Vitae, Fred E. Foldvary
 Fred E. Foldvary, Biographical Sketch
 Chocolate Worker Slavery

External links

  Foldvary.net: Fred Foldvary's publications
  The Progress Report archives: Editorials by Fred Foldvary
 Scu.edu: photolink for Fred Foldvary 

1946 births
2021 deaths
20th-century American male writers
20th-century American non-fiction writers
21st-century American economists
21st-century American male writers
21st-century American non-fiction writers
American economics writers
American male non-fiction writers
American people of Hungarian descent
California Libertarians
Georgist economists
Libertarian economists
San Jose State University faculty
Santa Clara University people
Writers from the San Francisco Bay Area